Ahmed Siddiqui may refer to:
 Ahmed Siddiqui (American youth) (born 1996), captured by counter-security officials with his mother Aafia Siddiqui when he was still a child